Dynamite Deluxe is a German hip hop group hailing from Hamburg, consisting of the MC Samy Deluxe, producer Tropf and producer/DJ Dynamite (alias Joni Rewind).

In 1997, the trio released their  first mixtape "Dynamite Deluxe Demo", which was an 8-track EP produced in a very small amount. 

Although Samy Deluxe left the group in early 2001.

Discography

Albums
 2000: Deluxe Soundsystem (CD/LP)
 2008: TNT

Singles, 12inches & EPs
 1997: "Dynamite Deluxe Demo" (MC)
 1997: "monkey"
 1998: "Ultimative Freestyletape" with Das Bo (MC)
 1998: "Pures Gift" ("Pure Poison")
 1998: "Deluxe Beats" (Instrumental)
 1999: "Samy Deluxe" / "MCees"
 1999: "The Classic Vinyl Files" (CD)
 2000: "Grüne Brille" (CD) ("Green Glasses")
 2000: "Ladies & Gentlemen" (CD)
 2000: "Wie jetzt" (CD) ("How now")
 2008: "Dynamit!" (CD)
 2008: "Alles bleibt anders" (CD) ("Everything stays different")

Other 
 2007: Boombox (Videosingle, Internet Exclusive)

External links
 Deluxe Records
 Dynamite Deluxe Homepage

Musical groups from Hamburg
Hamburg hip hop
German hip hop groups